Astata boops is a Palearctic species of solitary wasp. It is associated with sandy habitats and preys on the nymphs of pentatomid bugs.

References

External links
Images representing Astata boops

Hymenoptera of Europe
Crabronidae
Insects described in 1781